Major Justino Mariño Cuesto Air Base  is a Colombian military base assigned to the Colombian Air Force (Fuerza Aérea Colombiana or FAC) Maintenance Air Command (Comando Aéreo de Mantenimiento or CAMAN). The base is located in Madrid, a municipality in the Cundinamarca department of Colombia. It is named in honor of Major Justino Mariño Cuesto.

Facilities 

See also
Transport in Colombia
List of airports in Colombia

References

Colombian Air Force bases
Buildings and structures in Cundinamarca Department